Bruno Paillard is a Champagne producer based in Reims in the Champagne region. The house was founded in 1981 by Bruno Paillard (born 1953), after he had worked as a broker in the region since 1975. The first own vineyards were bought in 1994, and the house's own  supply around one-third of the grapes need for the annual production of around 500,000 bottles.

The house produces both vintage and non-vintage cuvées.

See also
 List of Champagne houses

References

External links
 Official website

Champagne producers